Girolamo Colonna di Sciarra (8 May 1708 – 18 January 1763) was an Italian Catholic Cardinal of the noble Colonna di Sciarra family.

Biography
Born in Rome, he was the brother of Prospero Colonna di Sciarra and grand-uncle of Benedetto Barberini, who, after the merger of the Barberini and Colonna families, was also referred to as Benedetto Barberini Colonna di Sciarra. He was a distant relative of  Oddone Colonna, who was elected to the papacy as Pope Martin V. He was also lay abbot of Santa Maria in Sylvis, in Friuli.

Between 1756 and his death at Rome in 1763, he was Camerlengo of the Holy Roman Church.

References

1708 births
1763 deaths
Girolamo
Nobility from Rome
18th-century Italian cardinals
Clergy from Rome